The Fab Four was a nickname for the Beatles.

Fab Four may also refer to:

The Fab Four (tribute), a Beatles tribute band
The Revols or the Fab Four, a Canadian band formed in 1957
The Fab 4, a Dell Comics superhero group

See also
 Fabulous Four (disambiguation)
 The Fab Faux, a Beatles tribute band
 Fab Five (disambiguation)
 Prefab Four (disambiguation)